Wendy Mary Callan was Dean of Killala from 2012 to 2013.

Callan was born in 1952, educated at Oxford Brookes University and ordained in 2000. After a curacy in Bicester she was Vicar of Shipton-under-Wychwood from 2003 until 2010. In that year she became the incumbent at Kilmoremoy.

Notes

1952 births
21st-century Anglican priests
Living people
Deans of Killala
Alumni of Oxford Brookes University